JS Takashio (SS-597) is the eighth boat of the s. She was commissioned on 9 March 2005.

Construction and career
Takashio was laid down at Mitsubishi Heavy Industries Kobe Shipyard on 30 January 2001 and launched on 1 October 2003. She was commissioned on 9 March 2005 and deployed to Yokohama.

On 10 October 2012, she headed for Hawaii via Guam for training in the United States, and was dispatched until 23 January 2013. From 22 July to 21 October 2016, she participated in the US dispatch training and conducted offshore training and facility use training in the Hawaiian Islands area.

Gallery

Citations

External links

2003 ships
Oyashio-class submarines
Ships built by Mitsubishi Heavy Industries